The South African Broadcasting Corporation (SABC) is the public broadcaster in South Africa, and provides 19 radio stations (AM/FM) as well as six television broadcasts to the general public. It is one of the largest of South Africa's state-owned enterprises.

I 
 Interster

L 
 Liewe Heksie

S 
 Skeem Saam (SABC 1)
 Soul City (SABC 1)

T 
 Takalani Sesame (SABC 1–3)
 Thabang Thabong

U 
 Uzalo (SABC 1)

Y 
 Yizo Yizo

References

Children
SABC Children